, there were about 17,000 electric vehicles in Nevada, accounting for 0.7% of vehicles in the state. Electric vehicles account for about 4.6% of all vehicle sales in the state.

Charging stations
In 2021, the Nevada Public Utilities Commission allocated  to electric vehicle infrastructure.

The Infrastructure Investment and Jobs Act, signed into law in November 2021, allocates  to electric vehicle charging stations in Nevada.

Manufacturing
Nevada has been proposed as an electric vehicle manufacturing hub, due to its large reserves of lithium, a key component of electric vehicle batteries.

Public opinion
A poll conducted by Coltura in 2021 showed 52% of voters in Nevada supporting the state fully transitioning to electric cars by 2030.

By region

Las Vegas
, there are about 6,000 AC charging stations and 40 DC charging stations in the Las Vegas Valley.

References

Road transportation in Nevada
Nevada